Major General Horace Leslie Birks CB DSO (7 May 1897 – 25 March 1985) was a senior officer of the British Army who saw active service during both the First World War and the Second World War, where he commanded the 10th Armoured Division.

Military career
Educated at University College School, Birks volunteered for military service in the British Army, joining the London Rifle Brigade in 1915 during the First World War and, after serving on the Western Front, was commissioned as a second lieutenant into the Machine Gun Corps Heavy Branch in 1917 and fought at the Battle of Cambrai later that year.

He remained in the army after the war and was appointed an instructor at the Royal Tank Corps Schools in 1919 and, after service in India and then as a General Staff Officer (GSO) back in the United Kingdom, he became an instructor at the Staff College, Quetta in 1937.

He served in the Second World War as second-in-command (2IC) of 4th Armoured Brigade in Egypt from 1940, then took command of the 126th Infantry Brigade from September 1941. The brigade was part of the 42nd (East Lancashire) Infantry Division and converted to an armoured role as the 11th Tank Brigade in 1942 and remained under Birks' command. It did not see active service as a unit, and spent the war in the United Kingdom, as part of the 42nd Armoured Division, before disbandment in late 1943. He went on to be General Officer Commanding (GOC) 10th Armoured Division in North Africa in January 1943 and Commander of the Royal Armoured Corps for the Allied Central Mediterranean Force in Italy in 1944 before retiring from the army in 1946.

In an interview with the BBC in 1963 Birks detailed his involvement in the tank battles of the First World War.

References

Bibliography

External links
British Army Officers 1939−1945
Generals of World War II
Imperial War Museum Interview
BBC Interview for The Great War Interviews recorded in 1964 and broadcast in 2014

 

1897 births
1985 deaths
Academics of the Staff College, Quetta
British Army personnel of World War I
British Army generals of World War II
Companions of the Order of the Bath
Companions of the Distinguished Service Order
People educated at University College School
People from Stoke Newington
Machine Gun Corps officers
Worcestershire Regiment officers
Royal Tank Regiment officers
Graduates of the Staff College, Quetta
London Rifle Brigade soldiers
British Army major generals
Military personnel from London